Bernard Caulfield may refer to

 Bernard G. Caulfield (1828–1887), American politician
 Bernard Caulfield (judge) (1914–1994), British judge